Wowow (stylized in all-uppercase and written as such in Japanese; Japanese pronunciation: Wauwau) is a satellite broadcasting and premium satellite television station owned and operated by . Its headquarters are located on the 21st floor of the Akasaka Park Building in Akasaka, Minato, Tokyo. Its broadcasting center is in Koto, Tokyo.

On October 1, 2011, Wowow expanded their single channel broadcast satellite service to provide three high-definition TV channels:

 Wowow Prime (WOWOWプライム), a general entertainment channel.
 Wowow Live (WOWOWライブ), covering sports, documentaries, movies and live performances.
 Wowow Cinema (WOWOWシネマ), a 24-hour movie channel. All foreign movies aired in original language with Japanese subtitles.
 Wowow 4K (WOWOWチャンネル)

Overview 
Wowow was the first 24/7, 3 channel, full high-definition broadcaster in Japan.

Wowow began pre-opening broadcasts on November 29, 1990, with service beginning the following day, on November 30, 1990. Digital broadcasting began on December 1, 2000. The network began with 207,753 subscribers (31.5 billion yen in sales), growing to 2,667,414 two years later (64.5 billion yen in sales). As of December 2011, Wowow claimed approximately 2.56 million subscribers to its digital service. On July 24, 2011, Wowow shut down its analog broadcast.

Wowow mostly rebroadcasts movies, but is also well known for showing (and even co-producing and/or assisting in the production of) original anime series such as Big O, Brain Powerd, Carried by the Wind: Tsukikage Ran, Trinity Blood, Cowboy Bebop (the complete uncut version), Shinreigari/Ghost Hound, Crest of the Stars, Ergo Proxy, X/1999, SHUFFLE!, Paranoia Agent, Now and Then, Here and There, Le Chevalier d'Eon, the 2016 Berserk series as well as the Anime Complex block. Due to the looser broadcast standards for satellite television in Japan, Wowow has become a primary means of widespread distribution for anime with themes or subject matter that the broadcast networks cannot show. Several anime studios have partnership deals for distributing their more mature series, with the famed Studio Madhouse among them.

The channel's name is a double "Wow", and the three W's also stand for "World-Wide-Watching".

Previously Wowow's headquarters were in another facility in Akasaka.

Programming 
Wowow also broadcasts Japanese-dubbed American television series such as Friends, CSI: Crime Scene Investigation, Sex and the City, The Sopranos, Cold Case, Grey's Anatomy, Medium, The 4400, Animaniacs, South Park, and The Simpsons, among others. Wowow has also screened Ultimate Fighting Championship events for Japanese audiences, the Korean drama My Lovely Sam Soon and the UK comedy sketch show Little Britain, as well as the British drama/action show Ultimate Force under the name SAS: British Special Forces.

Sports 
Wowow has broadcast all four tennis Grand Slam Championships since 2008. They are the Australian Open, the French Open, Wimbledon and the US Open. They broadcast UFC Japan on February 26, 2012, and have since continued to broadcast UFC events.
Current broadcast lineup
Australian Open
French Open
The Championships, Wimbledon
US Open
ATP Tour Masters 1000
ATP 500 series
ATP 250 series
La Liga
UEFA Euro Championship
UEFA Champions League
UEFA Europa League
"Wowow Excite Match" (Boxing)
UFC
Super Rugby
LPGA Tour

President 
The president and CEO of Wowow as of March 2021 is Akira Tanaka.

See also

References

External links
 WOWOW satellite website
 WOWOW satellite website 
 

 
1991 establishments in Japan
Mass media companies based in Tokyo
Television networks in Japan
Minato, Tokyo
Television channels and stations established in 1991